Crummock Water is a lake in the Lake District in Cumbria, North West England situated between Buttermere to the south and Loweswater to the north. The River Cocker is considered to start at the north of the lake, before then flowing into Lorton Vale. The hill of Mellbreak runs the full length of the lake on its western side; as Alfred Wainwright described it 'no pairing of hill and lake in Lakeland have a closer partnership than these'. The lake is owned by the National Trust.

"The meaning of 'Crummock' seems to be 'Crooked one', from British"  (Brythonic Celtic) "'crumbaco'-'crooked'". This may refer to the winding course of the River Cocker, which flows out of the lake, or refer to the bending nature of the lake itself. The word "'water' is the main Lakeland term for 'lake'".

Water from the lake was treated at Cornhow water treatment works, near Loweswater, and was distributed to the towns of Silloth-on-Solway, Maryport, Workington, and many smaller towns, villages, and hamlets in the surrounding area for drinking and all other uses. This use ceased in October 2022 with the commissioning of the United Utilities pipeline to bring supply from Thirlmere.

Crummock Water gained attention in 1988 when the body of Sheena Owlett was found in the lake.  It later transpired she had been murdered in Wetherby, West Yorkshire.

Gallery

References

External links
Crummock Water
An Illustrated Guide -Crummock Water
The Cumbria Directory - Crummock Water

Lakes of the Lake District
Cumberland
Buttermere, Cumbria (village)